Paul Samuel Tobin (November 23, 1909 – September 6, 2003) was an American professional basketball player. Hyatt played in the National Basketball League from 1937 to 1940, competing for the Akron Firestone Non-Skids, and won two league championships in 1938–39 and 1939–40. He was the brother-in-law of Soup Cable, a teammate of Tobin's with Akron.

References

1909 births
2003 deaths
Akron Firestone Non-Skids players
American men's basketball players
Basketball players from Akron, Ohio
Basketball players from Paterson, New Jersey
Guards (basketball)